Archibald Fletcher may refer to:

Archibald Fletcher (reformer) (1746–1828), Scottish reformer
Archie Fletcher (1890–?), American songwriter and music publisher
Archibald Fletcher on 1956 Birthday Honours